47th Nigar Awards were held on 16 March 2017. They were held after a hiatus of 15 years.

Nominees 
Nominations were announced on 20 February 2017.

References 

Nigar Awards
2016 film awards
2016 in Pakistani music
2016 in Pakistani cinema
2017 music awards